John Refoua (born December 8, 1964) is an American film editor.  He was nominated at the 2009 Academy Awards for Best Film Editing for the film Avatar. He was nominated along with James Cameron and Stephen E. Rivkin.
He has worked on television series, including Touched by an Angel, Twin Peaks and Law & Order.

Awards
Refoua has had 2 wins and 8 nominations for his editing work.
Won:
2010 Broadcast Film Critics Association Awards for Best Editing on Avatar (2009) (Shared with: Stephen E. Rivkin)
2009 Phoenix Film Critics Society Awards for Best Film Editing on Avatar (2009) (Shared with: James Cameron and Stephen E. Rivkin)

Nominations:
2010 Academy Awards, USA for Best Achievement in Film Editing on Avatar (2009) (Shared with: Stephen E. Rivkin and James Cameron)
2010 BAFTA Awards for Best Editing on Avatar (2009) (Shared with: Stephen E. Rivkin and James Cameron)
2010 American Cinema Editors, USA for Best Edited Feature Film (Dramatic) on Avatar (2009) (Shared with: Stephen E. Rivkin and James Cameron)
2010 Hollywood Post Alliance, US for Outstanding Editing on a Feature Film on Avatar (2009) (Shared with: Stephen E. Rivkin and James Cameron)
2010 Online Film & Television Association for Best Film Editing on Avatar (2009) (Shared with: Stephen E. Rivkin and James Cameron)
2010 Online Film Critics Society Award for Best Editing on Avatar (2009) (Shared with: Stephen E. Rivkin and James Cameron)
2009 Awards Circuit Community Award for Best Film Editing on Avatar (2009) (Shared with: Stephen E. Rivkin and James Cameron)

Filmography
Avatar 3 (2024)
Avatar: The Way of Water (2022)
Geostorm (2017)
Transformers: The Last Knight (2017)
The Magnificent Seven (2016)
Southpaw (2015)
The Equalizer (2014)
Olympus Has Fallen (2013)
21 & Over (2013)
Avatar (2009)
Balls of Fury (2007)
Reno 911!: Miami (2007)
Ghosts of the Abyss (2003)
Soft Toilet Seats (1999)

References

External links
 

American film editors
Living people
1964 births